The 83rd Pennsylvania House of Representatives District is located in central Pennsylvania and has been represented by Jamie Flick since 2023.

District profile
The 83rd District is located in Lycoming County and Union County and includes the following areas: 

Lycoming County

Armstrong Township
Brady Township
Clinton Township
Duboistown
Loyalsock Township
Montgomery
South Williamsport
Susquehanna Township
Williamsport 
Washington Township

Union County
Gregg Township
White Deer Township

Representatives

References

Government of Lycoming County, Pennsylvania
83